Bar is a rural locality (a selo) in Mukhorshibirsky District, Republic of Buryatia, Russia. The population was 466 as of 2010. There are 18 streets.

Geography 
Bar is located 37 km northwest of Mukhorshibir (the district's administrative centre) by road. Khoshun-Uzur is the nearest rural locality.

References 

Rural localities in Mukhorshibirsky District